Edvard Vecko (born October 29, 1944) is a male former international table tennis player from Slovenia.

He won a bronze medal at the 1969 World Table Tennis Championships in the Swaythling Cup (men's team event) with Zlatko Cordas, Antun Stipančić, Dragutin Šurbek and Istvan Korpa for Yugoslavia.

He also won five European Table Tennis Championships medals.

See also
 List of table tennis players
 List of World Table Tennis Championships medalists

References

Yugoslav table tennis players
Slovenian male table tennis players
1944 births
Living people
World Table Tennis Championships medalists